Skanderbeg's rebellion was an almost 25-year long anti-Ottoman rebellion led by the renegade Ottoman sanjakbey Skanderbeg in the territory which belonged to the Ottoman sanjaks of Albania, Dibra and Ohrid (modern-day Albania and North Macedonia). The rebellion was the result of initial Christian victories in the Crusade of Varna in 1443. After Ottoman defeat in the Battle of Niš, Skanderbeg, then sanjakbey of the Sanjak of Debar, mistakenly believed that Christians would succeed in pushing the Ottomans out of Europe. Like many other regional Ottoman officials, he deserted the Ottoman army to raise rebellion in his sanjak of Dibra and the surrounding region. Initially, his plan was successful and soon large parts of the Sanjak of Dibra and north-east parts of the Sanjak of Albania were captured by the rebels who also fought against regular Ottoman forces in the Sanjak of Ohrid.

The rebellion of Skanderbeg was a rare successful instance of resistance by Christians during the 15th century and through his leadership led Albanians in guerrilla warfare against the Ottomans. Skanderbeg's revolt represented a reaction by sections of local society and feudal lords against the loss of privilege and the exactions of the Ottoman government which they resented. In addition the League fought against members of their own ethnic groups because the Ottoman forces, both commanders and soldiers, were also composed of local people (Albanians, Slavs, Vlachs, Greeks and Turkish timar holders), as well as Turks from Anatolia.

Skanderbeg managed to capture Krujë using a forged letter of the sultan and, according to some sources, impaled captured Ottoman officials who refused to be baptized into Christianity. On 2 March 1444 the regional Albanian chieftains and nobles united against the Ottoman Empire and established an alliance (League of Lezhë) which was dissolved by 1479.

Because of the frequent conflicts between rival families in Albania during Skanderbeg's rebellion, particularly between Skanderbeg and Lekë Dukagjini, Albanian studies scholar Robert Elsie described the period as more of an Albanian civil war. However, Skanderbeg reconciled with Lekë in 1453 and re-allied with Gjergj Arianiti in 1456, following the end of relations with both parties around 1459.

Background 
In Albania, the rebellion against the Ottomans had already been smouldering for years before Skanderbeg deserted the Ottoman army. The most notable earlier revolt was revolt of 1432–36 led principally by Gjergj Arianiti. Although Skanderbeg was summoned by his relatives during this rebellion, he remained loyal to the sultan and did not fight the Ottomans. After this rebellion was suppressed by the Ottomans, Arianiti again revolted against the Ottomans in the region of central Albania in August 1443.

Skanderbeg decided to leave his position of Ottoman sanjakbey and revolt against the Ottomans only after the victorious Crusade of Varna in 1443. Successes of the crusaders inspired revolt of Skanderbeg and revolt of Constantine XI Palaiologos in the Despotate of the Morea. In early November 1443, Skanderbeg deserted the forces of Sultan Murad II during the Battle of Niš, while fighting against the crusaders of John Hunyadi. Skanderbeg quit the field along with 300 other Albanians serving in the Ottoman army. He immediately led his men to Krujë, where he arrived on November 28, and by the use of a forged letter from Sultan Murad to the Governor of Krujë he became lord of the city. To reinforce his intention of gaining control of the former domains of Zeta, Skanderbeg proclaimed himself the heir of the Balšić family. After capturing some less important surrounding castles (Petrela, Prezë, Guri i Bardhë, Svetigrad, Modrič and others) and eventually gaining control over more than his father Gjon Kastrioti's domains, Skanderbeg abjured Islam and proclaimed himself the avenger of his family and country. He raised a red flag with a black double-headed eagle on it: Albania uses a similar flag as its national symbol to this day.

Forces 

Dorotheos, the Archbishop of Ohrid and clerics and boyars of Ohrid Archbishopric together with considerable number of Christian citizens of Ohrid were expatriated by sultan to Istanbul in 1466 because of their anti-Ottoman activities during Skanderbeg's rebellion. Skanderbeg's rebellion was also supported by Greeks in the Morea. According to Fan Noli, the most reliable counselor of Skanderbeg was Vladan Jurica. Himara also supported the war and supplied men to fight under Skanderbeg.

League of Lezhë (1444–1450)

On 2 March 1444 the regional Albanian and Zetan chieftains united against the Ottoman Empire. This alliance (League of Lezhë) was forged in the Venetian held Lezhë. The main members of the league were the Arianiti, Balšić, Dukagjini, Muzaka, Spani, Thopia and Crnojevići. All earlier and many modern historians accepted Marin Barleti's news about this meeting in Lezhë (without giving it equal weight), although no contemporary Venetian document mentions it. Barleti referred to the meeting as the generalis concilium or universum concilium [general or whole council]; the term "League of Lezhë" was coined by subsequent historians.

Early battles 
Kenneth Meyer Setton claims that majority of accounts on Skanderbeg's activities in the period 1443–1444 "owe far more to fancy than to fact." Soon after Skanderbeg captured Krujë using the forged letter to take control from Zabel Pasha, his rebels managed to capture many Ottoman fortresses including strategically very important Svetigrad (Kodžadžik) taken with support of Moisi Arianit Golemi and 3,000 rebels from Debar. According to some sources, Skanderbeg impaled captured Ottoman officials who refused to be baptized into Christianity.

The first battle of Skanderbeg's rebels against the Ottomans was fought on 10 October 1445, on the mountain Mokra. According to Setton, after Skanderbeg was allegedly victorious in the Battle of Torvioll, the Hungarians are said to have sung praises about him and urged Skanderbeg to join the alliance of Hungary, the Papacy and Burgundy against the Ottomans. In the spring of 1446, using help of  Ragusan diplomats, Skanderbeg requested support from the Pope and Kingdom of Hungary for his struggle against the Ottomans.

War against Venice 

Marin Span was commander of Skanderbeg's forces which lost the fortress Baleč to Venetian forces in 1448 during Skanderbeg's war against Venice. Marin and his soldiers retreated toward Dagnum after being informed by his relative Peter Span about the large Venetian forces heading toward Baleč.

Treaty of Gaeta 

On 26 March 1450 a political treaty was stipulated in Gaeta between Alfonso V for the Kingdom of Naples and Stefan, Bishop of Krujë, and Nikollë de Berguçi, ambassadors of Skanderbeg. In the treaty Skanderbeg would recognize himself a vassal of the Kingdom of Naples, and in return he would have the Kingdom's protection from the Ottoman Empire. After Alfonso signed this treaty with Skanderbeg, he signed similar treaties with other chieftains from Albania: Gjergj Arianiti, Gjin Muzaka, George Strez Balšić, Peter Spani, Paul Dukagjini, Thopia Muzaka, Peter of Himara, Simon Zenebishi and Carlo II Tocco. By the end of 1450 Skanderbeg also agreed peace Ottomans and obliged himself to pay tribute to the sultan.

To follow the treaty of Gaeta, Naples sent a detachment of 100 Napolitan soldiers commanded by Bernard Vaquer to the castle of Kruje in the end of May 1451. Vaquer was appointed as special commissioner and took over Kruje on behalf of the Kingdom of Naples and put its garrison under his command.

Aftermath 
Ivan Strez Balšić was perceived by Venice as Skanderbeg's successor, whilst Lekë Dukagjini became the leader of the League. After Skanderbeg's death Ivan and his brother Gojko Balšić, together with Leke, Progon and Nicholas Dukagjini, continued to fight for Venice. In 1469 Ivan requested from the Venetian Senate to return him his confiscated property consisting of Castle Petrela, woivodate of "Terra nuova" of Kruje (unknown position), territory between Kruje and Durrës and villages in the region of Bushnesh (today part of the Kodër-Thumanë municipality). Venice largely conceded to the wishes of Ivan Balšić and installed him as Skanderbeg's successor.

See also 
 Timeline of Skanderbeg

References

Sources 
 
 
 
 

15th-century rebellions
Rebellions against the Ottoman Empire
Warfare by Skanderbeg